Mike Percy may refer to:

 Mike Percy (musician), bass guitarist with Dead or Alive
 Mike Percy (politician), academic and former politician in Alberta, Canada